I Sell Anything is a 1934 American film directed by Robert Florey and starring Pat O'Brien, Ann Dvorak, and Claire Dodd. It was produced by First National Pictures.  Robert Florey directed.

O'Brien plays Spot Cash Cutler, a "smooth swindler" of phony jewels and antiques. Two women compete for Cutler's attention: Barbara (Dvorak), a waif; and Millicent Clark (Dodd), a rich girl.

Cast 

 Pat O'Brien as Spot Cash Cutler
 Ann Dvorak as Barbara
 Claire Dodd as Millicent Clark
 Roscoe Karns as Monk
 Hobart Cavanaugh as First Stooge
 Russell Hopton as Smiley Thompson
 Robert Barrat as McPherson
 Harry Tyler as Second Stooge
 Gus Shy as Third Stooge
 Leonard Carey as Chauffeur
 Ferdinand Gottschalk as Barouche
 Clay Clement as Peter Van Gruen
 Herman Bing as Bidder (uncredited)
 Gino Corrado as Waiter (uncredited)

References

External links 
 
 

1934 romantic comedy films
American romantic comedy films
Films directed by Robert Florey
First National Pictures films
Warner Bros. films
Films produced by Samuel Bischoff
American black-and-white films
1934 films
1930s American films